Bronze is a metallic brown color which resembles the metal alloy bronze. 

The first recorded use of bronze as a color name in English was in 1753.


Variations

Blast-off bronze

Blast-off bronze is one of the colors in the special set of metallic Crayola crayons called Metallic FX, the colors of which were  formulated by Crayola in 2001.

Antique bronze

The first recorded use of antique bronze as a color name in English was in 1910.

References

See also 
 Bronze and brass ornamental work
 List of colors
 

Bronze